"Get Da Money" is a song by American hip hop artist Erick Sermon (released under the moniker Erick Onasis) recorded for his third album Def Squad Presents Erick Onasis (2000). The song, which features fellow hip hop artist Ja Rule, was released as the second single for the album in 2000.

Track listing
12", Vinyl
"Get Da Money" (Main Pass) - 3:37
"Get Da Money" (Clean) - 3:37
"Get Da Money" (Instrumental) - 3:37
"Get Da Money" (A Capella) - 3:37

Chart performance

Notes

2000 singles
Erick Sermon songs
Ja Rule songs
DreamWorks Records singles
Song recordings produced by Erick Sermon
Songs written by Erick Sermon
2000 songs
Songs written by Ja Rule